Loch of Butterstone is a small freshwater loch, almost circular in shape, located within the nature reserve of the Cardney Estate, near Dunkeld in Perth and Kinross. It is one of a group of three lochs, which include Loch of the Lowes and Loch of Craiglush, which are located next to each other in southeast to northwest orientation. Loch of Butterstone is located at the top of the group at the northwest end, with Loch of the Lowes being at the southwest and Loch of Craiglush located north of Loch of the Lowes. The three lochs form a chain of lochs known as the Lunan Lochs.

Settlements
Dunkeld is the largest settlement, which is located southeast from the loch. The A923 main road passes to the north of the three lochs, which runs from Dundee to Dunkeld.

Geography

The loch lies at the head of the valley of the Lunan Burn, which flows east and southeast to join the River Isla near Coupar Angus. The primary feature of Loch of Butterstone, is the clearness of the water, which has been described as gin clear. This startling clearness is particularly noticeable in Scotland, when most lochs are peat lochs, and are therefore peaty in colour.

The three lochs are located in shallow valley, with a northeast orientation, looking from the Dunkeld side. At the other side of the valley is a number of shallow hills, including Crieff Hill, at the base of the three lochs, on the northeast orientation, rising to Craig More. The surrounding area is heavily wooded. On the west slope, looking from Dunkeld, is Drumbuie Wood.

Loch of Butterstone is a well known flyfishing loch.

References

Butterstone
Butterstone
Nature centres in Scotland
Protected areas of Perth and Kinross
Sites of Special Scientific Interest in Scotland
Conservation in the United Kingdom
Special Areas of Conservation in Scotland
Birdwatching sites in Scotland